Andriy Viktorovych Voronin (born 21 July 1979) is a Ukrainian professional football manager and a former player.

Voronin spent five full seasons in the Bundesliga of Germany, and last played as a striker or attacking midfielder for Dynamo Moscow.

His previous professional clubs include Borussia Mönchengladbach, Mainz 05, 1. FC Köln, Bayer Leverkusen, Liverpool, Hertha BSC and Dynamo Moscow. In the 2002–03 season, Voronin became top goalscorer in the 2. Bundesliga, which earned him a transfer to the Bundesliga club 1. FC Köln.

At international level, Voronin played 74 matches for Ukraine from his debut in 2002. He was in their squad for the 2006 FIFA World Cup and UEFA Euro 2012, after which he retired from international football.

Early life and personal life
Voronin was born in Odessa on 21 July 1979, to a Ukrainian Jewish mother and a Russian father. Both of his grandfathers fought against the Nazis in the Second World War. Voronin is married to his wife Yulia and they have three children together; Maria, Andriy Jr. and Sonja. He is a Ukrainian Orthodox Christian.

Career

Borussia Mönchengladbach
Voronin left his youth club Chornomorets Odessa in 1995 to move to Germany, where he joined Borussia Mönchengladbach. He made his debut in the German Bundesliga against Bayern Munich in 1997 at the age of 18, but went on to spend a couple of years mainly in Mönchengladbach's youth teams. Having played just seven games and scored one goal in the top division, he saw his team relegated and after one season and just two matches in the 2. Bundesliga joined fellow second division strugglers Mainz for a fee of €45,000.

Mainz 05
Voronin became Mainz' leading striker in his two seasons at the club, and in his third season became the top scorer in the 2. Bundesliga with 20 goals. Voronin's start to the 2002–03 season with Mainz prompted the following quote from German football daily kicker: "The star of the 23 year old forward is on a rise due to the new role he plays for the team – he has complete freedom of actions." This led to speculations about his future, with Dynamo Kyiv reported to be willing to bring him back to Ukraine.

VfB Stuttgart, Bologna and a number of other clubs were then reported to approach his agent and Mainz initiated negotiations to extend his contract. UEFA.com described Voronin as "one of the most sought-after talents in Germany." However, come the end of the season Mainz failed to win promotion. Voronin decided not to renew his contract and ultimately chose to continue his career with 1. FC Köln, who had just been promoted to the top division.

1. FC Köln
Köln were relegated at the end of the season, however Voronin stayed in the top flight after signing for Bayer Leverkusen. Bayer had been interested in Voronin since his time at Mainz and were also impressed with his performance for Köln in a 2–2 draw against them when Voronin scored one and created the other of Köln's goals. After that game Express called him "the only true good footballer at Köln" and Bild wrote: "Köln's only striker (Voronin) was more dangerous than Bayer's entire star attack (Schneider, Ponte, Neuville and Berbatov)."

Bayer Leverkusen
After a successful first two seasons with Bayer as well as at the international level (culminating in participation in the 2006 FIFA World Cup in Germany where Ukraine reached the quarterfinals), Voronin's contract was running out at the end of the 2006–07 season and he was reported to have declined Bayer's offer of an extension. According to the player, he was approached by clubs from France, Spain, Italy and Scotland (Celtic were reported to be contemplating a move).

Liverpool

On 26 February 2007, Liverpool announced that they had signed Voronin on a free transfer and that he would join the team during the summer. Voronin was unveiled as a Liverpool player on 6 July 2007 after signing a four-year deal.

Voronin made his Premier League debut on 11 August 2007, coming on as a substitute in the 78th minute against Aston Villa in a 2–1 victory. A few days later on 15 August 2007, he scored his first ever goal for Liverpool in the 1–0 1st leg Champions League qualifier against Toulouse.

Liverpool manager Rafa Benítez was clearly impressed with Voronin, saying:"He is clever, has great game awareness and gives us so many more options in attack. He can play behind a main striker, lead the line himself, or come into the attack from the flanks."

On 25 August 2007, Voronin scored his first Premier League goal against Sunderland in the 87th minute. He then scored his next goal in the next league game against Derby County which Liverpool comfortably won 6–0 to move top of the Premier League table. He also scored the first goal in the 2–2 draw with Tottenham Hotspur on 7 October 2007. He carried on his scoring record against Tottenham Hotspur by scoring in a win over the north London club on the last day of the season.

On 25 January 2008, Voronin injured his ankle during training. He underwent surgery and made a small number of appearances at the end of the season but failed to make an impact. This led to rumours that Benítez would sell him in order to raise funds for the summer 2008 transfer window, however Voronin played some of the summer friendlies scoring a total of 3 goals in the process.

He made his first start of the 2009–10 season in the Champions League group stage game against Lyon. He had a particularly poor day as he missed various opportunities to score including a one-on-one with Hugo Lloris. He was later substituted for Ryan Babel who scored Liverpool's goal.

Hertha BSC
On the last day of the transfer market Andriy Voronin agreed to be loaned to Hertha BSC for a season.

He had two goals in a 2–1 victory over Bayern Munich on 14 February, to propel Hertha into first place in the Bundesliga. On 7 March he netted a hat-trick against Energie Cottbus. On 11 April 2009, following a retaliatory foul against Leon Andreasen of Hannover 96, he was sent off, receiving the 1000th red card in Bundesliga history.

Voronin was unable to secure a permanent move back to Germany during the summer of 2009, and as a result he returned to the Liverpool squad for the start of the 2009–10 season.

Dynamo Moscow
On 8 January 2010, it was announced that Liverpool had accepted a £4 million offer for him from Dynamo Moscow, Two days later, Voronin officially signed for FC Dynamo Moscow.

Fortuna Düsseldorf
On 31 July 2012, Fortuna Düsseldorf announced to have signed Voronin for one year on loan from Dynamo Moscow.

International career

While at Mainz, Voronin was called up initially to Ukraine's Under-21 team and in January 2002 to the national team, at the age of 22. He made his international debut in a 4–1 friendly defeat to Romania in March 2002. However, he was dropped after that match, with coach Leonid Buriak explaining, "I've been to Germany twice to watch him and made a conclusion that Andriy cannot compete with [Andriy] Shevchenko, [Serhii] Rebrov, and [Andriy] Vorobei as a forward. He can play in midfield as well, but he still has to improve some aspects of his game. Anyway, we count on Voronin, especially considering his young age."

Voronin was ultimately recalled to the national side, scoring his first international goal in a 2–0 Euro 2004 qualifying win over Greece in September 2002 and a second one in a 2–2 draw against Spain in March 2003.

He was in the Ukrainian squad for the 2006 FIFA World Cup, in which Ukraine got to the quarter-finals, beaten by the eventual winners, Italy.

played in the finals of Cyprus International Football Tournaments 2009, where Ukraine beat Serbia(1:0)

Coaching career
On 14 October 2020 he returned to Dynamo Moscow as an assistant manager to Sandro Schwarz. He left the club on 1 March 2022 after 2022 Russian invasion of Ukraine began, stating "I do not see any possibility of staying in a country (Russia) whose army destroys our (Ukrainian) cities & fires at civilians.”

Career statistics

Club

International

Scores and results list Ukraine's goal tally first, score column indicates score after each Voronin goal.

Honours
Dynamo Moscow
 Russian Cup runner-up: 2011−12

Individual
 2. Bundesliga top scorer: 2002–03
 Baltic and Commonwealth of Independent States Footballer of the Year: 2011
 Ukrainian Footballer of the Year: 2011
 Ukrainian Bravery Order III Degree: 2008

References

External links

 Thisisanfield.com player profile
 
 
 Leverkusen who's who
 Voronin profile and statistics by season at kicker.de
 Profile on website Football Ukraine
 Voronin profile and statistics by season while at Mainz at FSV05.de
 Voronin profile, fotos and all goals
 
 
 
 LFChistory.net player profile
 
 
 

Ukrainian footballers
Ukrainian expatriate footballers
Ukraine international footballers
Borussia Mönchengladbach players
1. FSV Mainz 05 players
1. FC Köln players
Bayer 04 Leverkusen players
Liverpool F.C. players
Hertha BSC players
Fortuna Düsseldorf players
2006 FIFA World Cup players
UEFA Euro 2012 players
Footballers from Odesa
Ukrainian people of Russian descent
Ukrainian people of Jewish descent
1979 births
Living people
Bundesliga players
2. Bundesliga players
Premier League players
Expatriate footballers in Germany
Expatriate footballers in England
Expatriate footballers in Russia
FC Dynamo Moscow players
Russian Premier League players
Ukrainian expatriate sportspeople in Germany
Ukrainian expatriate sportspeople in England
Ukrainian expatriate sportspeople in Russia
Ukrainian football managers
Ukrainian expatriate football managers
Expatriate football managers in Germany
Expatriate football managers in Russia
Association football midfielders
Association football forwards
Eastern Orthodox Christians from Ukraine